Anas Rashid is an Indian actor who works in Hindi television He rose to fame for portraying Prithviraj Chauhan in the historical drama Dharti Ka Veer Yodha Prithviraj Chauhan (2006–09) and later as Sooraj Rathi in the soap opera Diya Aur Baati Hum, which ranked among the highest-rated Indian television series.

Early life
Rashid was born in Malerkotla into a  Muslim family. He has two brothers and two sisters. He did his schooling from an Urdu Medium School and has done his post-graduation in Psychology. He is fluent in Urdu, Punjabi, Arabic and Persian languages. He is also a well trained singer. He also won the title of Mr. Punjab in 2004.

Career
Rashid made his screen debut with the Star Plus drama Kahiin To Hoga as Kartik Ahluwalia. He went on to feature in a supporting role in the drama Aise Karo Naa Vidaa. However, his breakthrough role was the portrayal of Prithviraj Chauhan, in the historical drama Dharti Ka Veer Yodha Prithviraj Chauhan on Star Plus, which made him a household name in India. Anas worked as the male lead in Diya Aur Baati Hum, where he portrayed the role of Sooraj Rathi. Rashid also marked his singing debut with one of the series songs. Diya Aur Baati Hum ranked among the highest-rated Indian television serials. His performance in the series earned him wide recognition as well as several accolades.

In 2018, he made his feature film debut in the Punjabi film Nankana starring Gurdas Maan.

Personal life
Rashid married Heena Iqbal, a corporate professional from Chandigarh, on 10 September 2017. They have a daughter named Aayat, born on 11 February 2019. They have a son named Khabib Anas Rashid born in December 2020.

Television works

Awards
Indian Telly Awards

Lion Gold Awards

Indian Television Academy Awards

Awarded by UP Government

Indian Icon Awards

See also 

 List of Indian television actors

References

External links 

Living people
21st-century Indian male actors
Male actors in Hindi television
Indian male soap opera actors
Male actors from Punjab, India
Actors from Mumbai
1980 births